This is a list of seasons completed by the Iowa State Cyclones men's basketball team of the National Collegiate Athletic Association (NCAA) Division I.
The Iowa State fielded their first team in 1908 with S. Clyde Williams coaching.

Seasons

  Maury John coached the first five games of the season, going 4–1. Gus Guydon coached the remainder, going 11–10.
  ISU finished the season 7–20, but was later awarded a win vacated by Oklahoma State.
  Lynn Nance coached the first 18 games of the season, going 8–10 and 2–3 in conference. Rick Samuels coached the remainder, going 3–6 and 3–6 in conference.

References

Iowa State

Iowa State Cyclones basketball seasons